The 2017 Arab Club Championship was the 27th season of the Arab World's inter-club football tournament organised by UAFA, and the first season since it was renamed from the UAFA Club Cup to the Arab Club Championship. The competition was won by Tunisian club Espérance de Tunis, who defeated Jordanian side Al-Faisaly 3–2 after extra time in the final to secure a joint-record third title.

Allocation of entries
The following team entries allocation was announced by the Union of Arab Football Associations on 20 June 2016. Each association was given entry either to the qualifying play-off or to the group stage based on the FIFA World Ranking of the associations on 2 June 2016. Only teams who were champions or runners-up of either their nation's league or one of their nation's cup competitions were allowed to participate in the tournament.

Notes

Teams
The following 20 teams from 18 associations entered the competition.

Notes

Venues
The following three venues were chosen to host all matches from the group stage onwards.

Schedule
The schedule of the competition was as follows.

Qualifying play-off

The qualifying play-off was held between 14 September 2016 and 4 March 2017. The three winners of the play-off round advanced to the group stage to join the nine direct entrants.

Preliminary round 1
Asia Zone

Africa Zone

Notes

Preliminary round 2

|-
!colspan=5|Asia Zone

|-
!colspan=5|Africa Zone

|}

Play-off round

|-
!colspan=5|Asia Zone

|-
!colspan=5|Africa Zone

|}

Group stage
From the group stage onwards, the tournament was held in Egypt in the cities of Cairo and Alexandria. Twelve teams participated in the group stage, divided into three groups. The draw for the groups took place on 5 May 2017 in Cairo. The top team of each group along with the best runner-up advanced to the semi-finals.

Times listed are UTC+2.

Group A

Group B

Group C

Ranking of second-placed teams
The highest ranked second-placed team from the groups advanced to the knockout stage; the rest were eliminated.

Knockout stage
Matches were determined by a random draw.

Semi-finals

Final

Top scorers
Statistics exclude qualifying rounds.

Prize money
UAFA announced that the winner will receive $2.5 million, while $600,000 will go to the runner-up and the losing semi-finalists will each get $200,000.

Media
The tournament gained international coverage for being the first football tournament to be broadcast live on Twitter, with all 21 matches from the group stage and knockout stage being shown for free on the competition's official Twitter account.

Broadcasting

Notes

References

External links
UAFA Official website 

2017
2016 in Asian football
2016 in African football
2017 in Asian football
2017 in African football